The Rawhide Kid is a lost 1928 "ethnic" American silent Western film directed by Del Andrews and starring Hoot Gibson. It was produced and released by Universal Pictures.

Cast
 Hoot Gibson as Dennis O'Hara
 Georgia Hale as Jessica Silverberg
 Frank Hagney as J. Francis Jackson
 William H. Strauss as Simon Silverberg
 Harry Todd as Comic
 Thomas G. Lingham as Deputy

References

External links
 
 

1928 films
Lost Western (genre) films
1928 Western (genre) films
Universal Pictures films
Lost American films
American black-and-white films
Films directed by Del Andrews
1928 lost films
Silent American Western (genre) films
1920s American films